The Real Housewives of Salt Lake City is an American reality television series that premiered November 11, 2020 on Bravo. The series third season chronicles the lives of five women in and around Salt Lake City— Lisa Barlow, Heather Gay, Meredith Marks, Whitney Rose and Jen Shah —as they balance their personal and business lives, along with their social circle.

Former cast members featured over the previous two seasons are: Mary Cosby (1-2) and Jennie Nguyen (2).

As of February 1, 2023, 56 original episodes of The Real Housewives of Salt Lake City have aired over three seasons.

Series overview

Episodes

Season 1 (2020–2021)

Lisa Barlow, Mary Cosby, Heather Gay, Meredith Marks, Whitney Rose and Jen Shah are introduced as series regulars.

Season 2 (2021–2022)

Jennie Nguyen joined the cast.

Season 3 (2022–2023)

Cosby and Nguyen departed as series regulars. Danna Bui-Negrete, Angie Harrington, and Angie Katsanevas served in recurring capacities.

References

External links
 

Real Housewives of Salt Lake City
Salt Lake City Episodes